The Leeds City Council elections were held on Thursday, 4 May 1990, with one third of the council and two casual vacancies in Beeston and North to be elected. There had been a number of by-elections in the interim, resulting in two Labour gains in Armley and Burmantofts from the Social and Liberal Democrats and holds elsewhere.

The election was held amidst deep unpopularity for the Conservative national government and their poll tax measure, resulting in the party's worst ever performance in the English locals. The effects it had in Leeds were no less severe, with the party obtaining a record low vote share, with their victories confined to just 4 of the 33 wards, restricted to their Northern heartlands – Cookridge, North, Roundhay and Wetherby – losing stalwarts Aireborough, Halton, Pudsey North and Weetwood to Labour for the first time.

Both the Conservative vote and the SLD vote were little changed from the previous election; the landslide was caused by a remarkable increase in Labour's vote – over 50% on recent elections – bringing with it a record turnout (with 1979 omitted). The SLD's slate was notably much reduced, fielding their lowest number of candidates since 1978, after their fall-back at their last outing. Similar to the last election, their sole loss was found in Armley to Labour, narrowly holding onto Otley & Wharfedale, but much more comfortably their Horsforth and Moortown seats. In total, Labour's five gains extended their majority by ten, comfortably surpassing party records in votes, vote share and council majority.

Elsewhere, the leader of the newly formed Liberal Party Michael Meadowcroft – alongside his fellow candidate in Harehills – won a respectable second place in Bramley. Meanwhile, their fellow SLD defectors, the SDP joined the Communists in producing just one candidate – with both collecting negligible support, suggesting possible demise (with the latter likely adversely impacted by recent international events).

Election result

This result has the following consequences for the total number of seats on the council after the elections:

Ward results

References

1990 English local elections
1990
1990s in Leeds